William Wade Dunham (born 1947) is an American writer who was originally trained in topology but became interested in the history of mathematics and specializes in Leonhard Euler. He has received several awards for writing and teaching on this subject.

Education
Dunham received his BS from the University of Pittsburgh in  1969, his MS from Ohio State in  1970, and his PhD from the same institution in 1974.

Writings
Dunham  won the American Association of Publishers' award for writing  the Best Mathematics Book of 1994 for his book  The Mathematical Universe. In his book Euler: The Master of Us All, he examines  Leonhard Euler's impressive mathematical work. He received a Lester R. Ford Award in 2006 for his expository article Touring the Calculus, and the Chauvenet Prize in 2022 for his article The Early (and Peculiar) History of the Möbius Function.

In 2007, Dunham gave a lecture about  Euler's product-sum formula and its relationship to analytic number theory, as well as discussed Euler's evaluation of a non-trivial integral at the celebration of "Year of Euler" by the Euler Society. He published a chapter "Euler and the Fundamental Theorem of Algebra" in the book The Genius of Euler published in 2007 to commemorate  the 300th birthday of Euler.

Works

Footnotes

External links

William Dunham at Muhlenberg College
A Tribute to Euler, William Dunham, YouTube
Your humble Servant, Is. Newton by William Dunham - YouTube
Your humble Servant, Is. Newton, Mathematical Association of America

1947 births
Living people
American science writers
University of Pittsburgh alumni
Ohio State University alumni
American historians of mathematics
Muhlenberg College faculty